Pamela Jepkirui (born 8 February 1996 Nandi) is a Kenyan volleyball player. She is part of the Kenya women's national volleyball team as an outside hitter. She participated at the 2018 FIVB Volleyball Women's World Championship. She was selected for the 2020 Summer Olympics. The Kenya national team set off for the Olympics in Tokyo in three batches to try and minimise the chances of being effected by the COVID-19 pandemic. Their opening match will be on 25 July in Tokyo against Japan.

She currently plays with Kenya Prisons.

Clubs 

  Kenya Prisons

References 

Living people
Kenyan women's volleyball players

1996 births
Volleyball players at the 2020 Summer Olympics
Olympic volleyball players of Kenya
People from Nyeri County